The New Neighbor is a 1953 American animated short film directed by Jack Hannah and produced by Walt Disney, featuring Donald Duck. In the short film, Donald moves to a new place and gets along with his new next-door neighbor, Pete. If good fences make good neighbors, then Pete and Donald must be the best neighbors of all!

Plot
Donald has moved into a new neighborhood to live in peace and greets his new neighbor, Pete, and his dog, Muncey. Unfortunately, it did not turn out to be a good meeting at all. Pete accidentally dumped his garbage and Muncey buried his bone into Donald's garden which makes it messed up, much to Donald's disappointment. Then, Pete went to Donald's house and asks Donald to borrow some ice cubes, but instead, he cleans up the refrigerator by taking all his food after Donald opens the door. Pete leaves while thanking him for his appreciation. Later, Muncey asked Donald by sending a note for a favor, to borrow Donald's dishes. Donald bursted angry that it wasn't helpful until Pete arrives again, showing the green porridge. Donald takes a spoonful of it and told Pete that he firstly liked it, but he suddenly coughs it out upon knowing that it was dog food (after Pete has told Muncey that he eats it). While they're walking along together, Pete told Muncey that Donald is too awkward.

On the second day, Donald and the whole neighborhood had their gardening time. Pete asks Donald to borrow his spade but he takes all of Donald's tools (fork, trowel, sprayer, pruners, clippers) instead. Donald wasn't appreciated with his empty wheelbarrow until it rains. He runs in the porch to dry but Pete reminds him that he returned his tools. Donald quickly takes them and went back inside the house while Pete sits reading his newspaper.

On the third day, Pete climbs up and trimming his tree until the wind pushed all the branches and leaves and fell onto Donald's lawn. Donald was shocked about this and Pete tells him: "Better rake 'em up quick! They'll ruin your lawn!" and laughs. Now, Donald was enraged and thinking Pete is doing these things on purpose, he had enough for that. Then, he quickly rakes up his lawn and puts them into an incinerator. Donald paused while he noticed Pete's laundry, then he laughs while inventing a plan to get back at him. He burns a pile of leaves with the fire and told Pete by showing him for the smoke covering his laundry. Then, Pete grabs a hose to douse the smoke out but instead, he sprayed Donald in the face. As Pete laughs at this, Donald puts the hose into his shorts and poking some holes with his pitchfork. Pete walks around looking like a fountain. Donald laughs but Pete smacked his head by a baseball bat, causing to escalate into a full-scale war, with crowds cheering and TV coverage.

The brawl gave attention to the whole neighborhood while the headlines were announcing and spreading across the country ("Neighborhood Brawl Grows", "War! Between Neighbors", "Neighbors Erupt! Television Covers Battle"). The crowd gathered up to watch the battle between Donald and Pete. By starting the battle, Pete begins to measure his property line by cutting most of Donald's tree then he says, "Let's watch that property line, punk!". Then, Donald cuts his longjohns as a result above his property line, and the battle starts to play on: Pete flinging apples to Donald, Donald catapulting paint on Pete's face with an axe, Pete dumping garbage on Donald, Donald flinging a trash lid to Pete and breaking his greenhouse, Pete tossing a grass cutter to Donald and damaging his roof, Donald and Pete playing on a "see-saw" ladder while the crowd was laughing at them. Then, Pete lifts the ladder and Donald runs over him with the grass cutter by latter after the "see-saw" battle.

The neighbors took the aided Donald and Pete for a time-out drinking water, and they gave them for another battle action by telling them, "Give him the old spike fence". Then, the battle continues as Pete and Donald building a spike fence very high between their property as the neighbors started to chant out "Higher! Higher! Higher!", until Muncey runs below the fence and digging gardens with the other dogs cheering for him. Suddenly, the spike fence begins to crumble and collapse; scaring all the neighbors and causing a huge wreck. On the last scene, Pete, all injured and bandaged up reluctantly moves away with his house taken with him. Donald also moves away but happily as he reads his paper. It turned out that no one won the battle; it was a draw.

Voice cast
 Clarence Nash as Donald Duck
 Billy Bletcher as Pete

Television
 The Mouse Factory, episode #1.11: "Homeowners"
 The New Mickey Mouse Club, February 8, 1977
 Good Morning, Mickey, episode #16
 Mickey's Mouse Tracks, episode #47
 Donald's Quack Attack, episode #50
 The Ink and Paint Club, episode #1.32: "Goin' to the Dogs"

Home media
The short was released on November 11, 2008, on Walt Disney Treasures: The Chronological Donald, Volume Four: 1951-1961.

Additional releases include:
 Walt Disney Cartoon Classics: Limited Gold Editions - Donald (VHS)

Notes
 At one point, Pete can be heard humming "Lambert the Sheepish Lion".
 The same bird that was seen in "Little April Shower" from Bambi, can be briefly spotted where he is doing the same movement from the original movie and the birds color is recolored.

References

External links 
 The New Neighbor on IMDb
 The New Neighbor at The Internet Animation Database
 The New Neighbor on Filmaffinity

Donald Duck short films
Films produced by Walt Disney
1950s Disney animated short films
Films directed by Jack Hannah
1953 animated films
1953 films
1950s English-language films